When a Stranger Calls is an American film series that comprises three standalone psychological thriller horror films, as well as an originating short film. The original film has gained a large cult following, with its first 20 minutes consistently regarded as one of the scariest opening scenes in movie history, inspiring many others, including the critically acclaimed hit Scream (1996) and its sequels. Inspired by Fred Walton's 1977 horror-thriller short film The Sitter, The series serves as a suspenseful retelling of the urban legend of "The babysitter and the man upstairs", about a babysitter, Jill Johnson, who is menaced by mysterious and frightening phone calls which are finally revealed to be coming from inside the house. The 1979 film is an expanded remake of Fred Walton and Steve Feke's short film The Sitter, which roughly comprised the first 20 minutes of this film, followed by an investigate segment in which a detective searches for the stranger. The 1993 sequel follows Johnson, now a college counselor, as she attempts to protect a student from another such stalker. The 2006 remake solely adapts the 20 minutes that served as the opening of the first film and entirety of The Sitter, extending the premise to a feature-length film.

Jill Johnson is the only character to appear in every film, with John Clifford, the Mandrakis couple and the Stranger each appearing in three films.

Films

Overview

The Sitter (1977)

In early 1977, Fred Walton and his old college friend Steve Feke were throwing around story ideas for a film and Feke told him the legendary tale of "The babysitter and the man upstairs" which Walton felt had potential for a film. The production of The Sitter was made on a low budget with both Feke and Walton working steadily for the financing, including their friends' contributing $1,000 here and there. The 22-minute film, shot on 35mm in three days in May 1977 on a budget of $12,000, closely prefigures the opening twenty minutes of When a Stranger Calls, now consistently regarded as one of the scariest openings in horror movie history. Once post-production on The Sitter was completed, Walton and Feke realized that the market for short films wasn't nearly as good as they had both anticipated. Although major studios were not interested in the short film, they were able to land a one-week showing at a theatre for consideration at the 1977 Academy Awards to qualify a nomination for Best Live Action Short. The Sitter had a short theatrical run being screened before Looking for Mr. Goodbar at Mann's Village Theatre in Westwood, California. In spite of its good reception, the film did not get nominated for an Oscar.

When a Stranger Calls (1979)

Executive producers Barry Krost and Douglas Chapin had gone to the theatre to see Looking for Mr. Goodbar, and both were so impressed by The Sitter that they sold Mel Simon on the idea of expanding it into a feature-length film, which eventually became When a Stranger Calls, directed and written again by Walton and Feke. The film was released in the United States on October 26, 1979, by Columbia Pictures. It was commercially successful, receiving a mixed critical reception, with many praising the opening scene and performances, but criticism for its writing and lack of scares, and having since gained cult status. The plot follows Jill Johnson, a young high school student babysitting for a very rich family, as she begins to receive strange phone calls threatening the children. When she finally realises that it's not a joke, she calls the police, only to find that the calls are coming from inside the house.

When a Stranger Calls Back (1993)

A made-for-television sequel, When a Stranger Calls Back, was released in 1993 on Showtime with Carol Kane and Charles Durning reprising their roles and Walton returning as director and writer, to mostly positive reviews.

When a Stranger Calls (2006)

Screen Gems first announced the production of a When a Stranger Calls remake in August 2004, with Jake Wade Wall penning the script, replacing plans by Screen Gems to release another theatrical sequel to the original film titled When a Stranger Returns. Evan Rachel Wood was offered the role of Jill, but turned it down, before Camilla Belle was ultimately cast in the role. The film adapts the first 20 minutes of the original film and entirety of The Sitter as the premise for the entirety of the film.

Principal cast and characters

Additional crew and production details

Reception

Box office and financial performance

Critical and public response

Home media

See also
 List of films featuring home invasions

References

 
American film series
Film series introduced in 1977
Film series introduced in 1979
Thriller film series
Horror film series